Eussoia leptodonta is a species of minute operculate snail, a marine gastropod mollusk or micromollusk in the family Assimineidae.

Description

Distribution
The species has only ever been found in Komati River estuary at Rikatla, Mozambique.

References

Assimineidae
Gastropods described in 1881
Invertebrates of Mozambique